Americus is a city in Lyon County, Kansas, United States.  As of the 2020 census, the population of the city was 776.  It is located northwest of the city of Emporia. Americus is often a waypoint in some Unbound Gravel bike races.

History
Americus was laid out in the fall of 1857. It was named for Amerigo Vespucci.

Americus was a station and shipping point on the Missouri–Kansas–Texas Railroad.

Geography
Americus is located at  (38.506448, -96.259598).

Demographics

Americus is part of the Emporia Micropolitan Statistical Area.

2010 census
As of the census of 2010, there were 894 people, 354 households, and 251 families residing in the city. The racial makeup of the city was 96.2% White, 0.2% Native American, 0.1% Asian, 0.6% from other races, and 2.9% from two or more races. Hispanic or Latino of any race were 4.1% of the population.

There were 354 households, of which 36.4% had children under the age of 18 living with them, 54.0% were married couples living together, 11.0% had a female householder with no husband present, 5.9% had a male householder with no wife present, and 29.1% were non-families. 24.0% of all households were made up of individuals, and 9.6% had someone living alone who was 65 years of age or older. The average household size was 2.53 and the average family size was 2.96.

The median age in the city was 38 years. 27.4% of residents were under the age of 18; 8.3% were between the ages of 18 and 24; 23.8% were from 25 to 44; 28.4% were from 45 to 64; and 12.2% were 65 years of age or older. The gender makeup of the city was 47.9% male and 52.1% female.

2000 census
As of the census of 2000, there were 938 people, 355 households, and 259 families residing in the city. The racial makeup of the city was 96.80% White, 0.32% African American, 0.43% Native American, 0.11% Asian, 1.07% from other races, and 1.28% from two or more races. Hispanic or Latino of any race were 1.71% of the population.

There were 355 households, out of which 39.2% had children under the age of 18 living with them, 58.9% were married couples living together, 10.4% had a female householder with no husband present, and 27.0% were non-families. 23.1% of all households were made up of individuals, and 10.1% had someone living alone who was 65 years of age or older. The average household size was 2.64 and the average family size was 3.12.

In the city, the population was spread out, with 29.9% under the age of 18, 8.6% from 18 to 24, 28.8% from 25 to 44, 22.8% from 45 to 64, and 9.9% who were 65 years of age or older. The median age was 35 years. For every 100 females, there were 93.0 males. For every 100 females age 18 and over, there were 94.7 males.

The median income for a household in the city was $35,859, and the median income for a family was $43,850. Males had a median income of $29,545 versus $21,705 for females. The per capita income for the city was $14,532. About 9.9% of families and 11.4% of the population were below the poverty line, including 15.0% of those under age 18 and 11.1% of those age 65 or over.

Education
The community is served by North Lyon County USD 251 public school district. The Northern Heights High School mascot is Wildcats.

Americus High School closed in school unification. The Americus Indians achieved a record of 26-0 to win the Kansas State High School boys Class B basketball championship in 1961.

Transportation

Notable people
Ross Grimsley, Major League Baseball pitcher in the 1950s
Chuck Norris, member of the Oregon House of Representatives
Grant Timmerman, U.S. Marine posthumously awarded the Medal of Honor during World War II

References

Further reading

External links
 City of Americus
 Americus - Directory of Public Officials
 Americus city map, KDOT

Cities in Kansas
Cities in Lyon County, Kansas
Emporia, Kansas micropolitan area
1857 establishments in Kansas Territory